Nazzareno Zamperla (25 April 1937 – 19 March 2020) was an Italian actor and stuntman.

Career
Born in Treviso into a circus family, Zamperla came to Rome in 1949 and worked primarily in the 1950s and 1960s as a stunt performer. His focus was on the sword and sandal films. In the 1960s and 1970s, he transitioned into appearances as an actor in front of the camera, and his focus shifted to Spaghetti Western productions, where he was also known under the name of Nick Anderson, while also continuing working behind the camera as a gun master. Zamperla's brother Rinaldo has also appeared in movies.

Filmography 

 La Strada (1954) – Man Restraining Zampano from Attacking (uncredited)
 The Knight of the Black Sword (1956) – Soldier (uncredited)
 Il Conte di Matera (1958) – Marco
 The Pirate of the Black Hawk (1958) – Pirato con Ambassadore Francesa (uncredited)
 Ben-Hur (1959) – Roman Soldier with a Bow on Galley (uncredited)
 Slave of Rome (1961) – Roman Soldier
 Hercules and the Conquest of Atlantis (1961) – Man in Tavern Fight (uncredited)
 Samson Against the Sheik (1962) – Fighter (uncredited)
 Zorro alla corte di Spagna (de) (1962) – Paquito
 Gladiators 7 (1962) – Vargas
 Tiger of the Seven Seas (1962) – Rick
 Zorro and the Three Musketeers (1963) – D'Artagnan
 Samson and the Slave Queen (1963) – Sadoch
 Sandokan the Great (1963) – Hirangù
 The Triumph of Hercules (1964) – Thief
 Pirates of Malaysia (1964) – Durango
 Adventures of the Bengal Lancers (1964) – Sgt. John Foster
 The Magnificent Gladiator (1964) – Orestes / Horatius
 Jungle Adventurer (1965) – Sitama's Man #1
 A Pistol for Ringo (1965) – Sancho's gang member
 Blood for a Silver Dollar (1965) – Phil O'Hara
 Seven Rebel Gladiators (1965)
 Seven Guns for the MacGregors (1966) – Peter MacGregor
 Kiss Kiss...Bang Bang (1966) – (uncredited)
 Sugar Colt (1966) – Soldier
 Up the MacGregors! (1967) – Peter MacGregor
 Seven Pistols for a Massacre (1967) – Tom, Peggy's Brother
 Your Turn to Die (1967) – Flash
 Seven Times Seven (1968) – Bananas
 Le bal des voyous (1968)
 Boot Hill (1969) – Franz – Acrobat
 Le tigri di Mompracem (1970) – (uncredited)
 The Scalawag Bunch (1971) – One of Robin's Men
 Lover of the Great Bear (1971) – Smuggler (uncredited)
 Those Dirty Dogs (1973) – Soldier (uncredited)
 Tony Arzenta (1973) – Man of Cutitta (uncredited)
 Three Tough Guys (1974) – Snake's henchman
 Street Law (1974) – Beard
 The White, the Yellow, and the Black (1975) – Sgt. Donovan
 Cry, Onion! (1975) – Oblò – 'Monocle' 
 La madama (1976)
 California (1977) – Brother of Northern Soldier (uncredited)
 A Man on His Knees (1979)
 Buddy Goes West (1981) – Slim Henchman (uncredited)
 Banana Joe (1982) – Hitman (uncredited)
 Thunder Warrior (1983) – Thomas's Friend
 Rolf (1984) – Bearded mercenary

References

External links 
 

1937 births
2020 deaths
Italian male film actors
Italian stunt performers
Male Spaghetti Western actors